Pseudomonas alcaligenes is a Gram-negative aerobic bacterium used for bioremediation purposes of oil pollution, pesticide substances, and certain chemical substances, as it can degrade polycyclic aromatic hydrocarbons. It can be a human pathogen, but occurrences are very rare. Based on 16S rRNA analysis, P. alcaligenes has been placed in the P. aeruginosa group.

References

External links
Type strain of Pseudomonas alcaligenes at BacDive -  the Bacterial Diversity Metadatabase

Pseudomonadales
Bacteria described in 1928